Deer Horn Hill is a mountain in Barnstable County, Massachusetts. Pine Hill is located northeast of Deer Horn Hill.

References

Mountains of Massachusetts
Mountains of Barnstable County, Massachusetts